Grub is a hamlet is the municipality of Amerang in Bavaria, Germany.

History 

Grub was first mentioned in 1467. The housing stock in 1857 consisted of residential building, horse and cow stable, barn, granary and oven. In 1871 the cowshed was rebuilt and in 1865 a bakehouse  and a laundry were added.

Literature 
 „Haus- und Hofgeschichte 1366-2010“ von Konrad Linner

Villages in Bavaria